Edward Chiwawa (born 1935) is a Zimbabwean sculptor.  Born northwest of Guruve, in 1960 he started how to sculpt by working with his cousin, Henry Munyaradzi.  From 1970 he was a resident of the Tengenenge Sculpture Community, he sold his sculptors from Tengenenge, but he never moved in there.  His sculptures are often heavily abstracted.  Chiwawa has exhibited in Europe and Australia.

References
Artists biography
Biographical sketch

1935 births
Living people
20th-century Zimbabwean sculptors
21st-century sculptors
People from Mashonaland Central Province